Stade Léonce Claireaux is a multi-use stadium in Saint-Pierre, Saint-Pierre and Miquelon, France.  It is currently used mostly for football matches.

External links
  Equipements sportifs et culturels à Saint Pierre (97500)

Football venues in France
Football venues in Saint Pierre and Miquelon
Saint-Pierre, Saint Pierre and Miquelon